Charles B. Archambeau is an American geophysicist.

Life
He graduated from California Institute of Technology with a PhD in 1964.
He taught at University of Colorado, and California Institute of Technology.

In 1997, he studied the geophysics of Yucca Mountain, with John Davies, commissioned by the state of Nevada.
He is President of Technology Research Associates corporation.  In 2010, he signed a letter in favor of the Integral Fast Reactor.

Awards
 1988 MacArthur Fellows Program

Works
 Dialogs on the Yucca Mountain controversy, Charles B. Archambeau, Christine M. Schluter, Jerry S. Szymanski, TRAC (Technology and Resource Assessment Corporation), 1993
 Earthquake hazards determinations based on tectonic stress measurements, University of Colorado, 1981
 Deterministic Methods of Seismic Source Identification, Defense Technical Information Center, 1983

References

External links
Oral history interview with Charles B. Archambeau on 24 July 1998, American Institute of Physics, Niels Bohr Library & Archives
"Charles B. Archambeau", Scientific Commons

Living people
Year of birth missing (living people)
California Institute of Technology alumni
University of Colorado faculty
California Institute of Technology faculty
MacArthur Fellows
American geophysicists